Amblyscirtes nysa, the nysa roadside skipper, is a species of grass skipper in the family of butterflies known as Hesperiidae. They are found in Central America and North America.

References

Further reading

 

Hesperiinae
Articles created by Qbugbot
Butterflies described in 1877